Two Canadian naval units have been named HMCS Fort William.

 (I) was a Second World War  renamed La Malbaie before commissioning.
 (II) was a Second World War  sold to Turkey in 1957 and renamed Bodrum.

Royal Canadian Navy ship names